Bullets & Lipstik may refer to:

 Bullets & Lipstik (album), an album by Pretty Boy Floyd
 Bullets & Lipstik (EP),an EP by Pretty Boy Floyd